Uncloudy Day is a collection of recordings made between 1956 and 1959 by the Staple Singers, many of which that were originally released as 10-inch, 78 rpm shellac discs, that became the first 12 inch Gospel LP released by the Vee-Jay label.

Critical reception

AllMusic reviewer Opal Nations stated "Classic folk-rooted gospel from this mixed group. Stinging Delta guitar. Stunning harmonies".

Track listing
All compositions by Roebuck Staples except where noted
 "Uncloudy Day" (Josiah Kelley Alwood) – 3:02
 "Let Me Ride" – 2:46
 "God's Wonderful Love" (James Bracken) – 2:46	
 "Help Me Jesus" – 2:45
 "I'm Coming Home" – 6:45
 "If I Could Hear My Mother Pray" (Mavis Staples) – 2:52
 "Low Is the Way" (Alex Bradford) – 2:36
 "I Had a Dream" – 2:55
 "On My Way to Heaven" – 2:24
 "Going Away" – 2:00
 "I'm Leaning" – 2:21
 "I Know I Got Religion" – 2:24

Personnel
Roebuck Staples – vocals, guitar
Cleotha Staples, Mavis Staples, Pervis Staples, Yvonne Staples – vocals

References

1959 albums
The Staple Singers albums
Vee-Jay Records albums